Sampués is a town and municipality located in the Sucre Department, northern Colombia.

References
 Gobernacion de Sucre - Sampués
 Sampués official website

Sucre